Lindi is a village in Audru Parish, Pärnu County, in southwestern Estonia, on the coast of Pärnu Bay (part of the Gulf of Riga). It has a population of 307 (as of 1 January 2011).

Lindi Nature Reserve with Lindi bog is located just southwest of Lindi, on the territory of Kõpu village.

References

Villages in Pärnu County
Kreis Pernau